Thursday's Children is a 1954 British short documentary film directed by Guy Brenton and Lindsay Anderson about The Royal School for the Deaf in Margate, Kent, UK, a residential school then teaching lip reading rather than sign language. Apart from music and narration, the film is nearly silent and focuses on the faces and gestures of the little boys and girls. It features methods and goals not now used, and notes that only one child in three will achieve true speech. Filmmakers Lindsay Anderson and Guy Brenton were unable to gain distribution for the film until it won an Oscar in 1955 for Documentary Short Subject. The Academy Film Archive preserved Thursday's Children in 2005.

Cast
 Richard Burton as Narrator

See also
 Richard Burton filmography

References

External links

1954 films
1954 documentary films
1954 short films
1950s short documentary films
Best Documentary Short Subject Academy Award winners
British black-and-white films
British short documentary films
British Sign Language films
Documentary films about deaf people
Films directed by Lindsay Anderson
Documentary films about special education
Deaf education
Films shot in Kent
1950s English-language films
1950s British films